Grungstadvatnet is a lake in the municipality of Høylandet in Trøndelag county, Norway.  There are salmon, sea trout, european eel, trout, and Arctic char in the lake.  The  lake lies just to the north of the large lake Eidsvatnet.

See also
List of lakes in Norway

References

Lakes of Trøndelag
Høylandet